Deuterixys is a genus of braconid wasps in the family Braconidae. There are about 18 described species in Deuterixys, found throughout most of the world.

Species
These 18 species belong to the genus Deuterixys:

 Deuterixys anica Austin & Dangerfield, 1992
 Deuterixys bennetti Whitfield, 1985
 Deuterixys bifossalis Zeng & Chen, 2011
 Deuterixys carbonaria (Wesmael, 1837)
 Deuterixys colombiana Whitfield & Oltra, 2005
 Deuterixys condarensis (Tobias, 1960)
 Deuterixys curticalcar Zeng & Chen, 2011
 Deuterixys erythrocephala Whitfield & Oltra, 2005
 Deuterixys hansoni Whitfield & Oltra, 2005
 Deuterixys pacifica Whitfield, 1985
 Deuterixys patro (Nixon, 1965)
 Deuterixys plugarui (Tobias, 1975)
 Deuterixys quercicola Whitfield, 1985
 Deuterixys rimulosa (Niezabitowski, 1910)
 Deuterixys svetlanae Kotenko, 2007
 Deuterixys tehuantepeca Whitfield & Oltra, 2005
 Deuterixys tenuiconvergens Zargar & Gupta, 2019
 Deuterixys x-formis Papp, 2012

References

Further reading

 
 
 

Microgastrinae